Megachile quinquelineata is a species of bee in the family Megachilidae. It was described by Theodore Dru Alison Cockerell in 1906.

References

Quinquelineata
Insects described in 1906